The following lists events that happened during 1884 in Australia.

Incumbents

Governors
Governors of the Australian colonies:
Governor of New South Wales – Lord Augustus Loftus
Governor of South Australia – William Cleaver Francis Robinson 
Governor of Tasmania – Major Sir George Strahan
Governor of Victoria – George Phipps, 2nd Marquess of Normanby then William Foster Stawell

Premiers
Premiers of the Australian colonies:
Premier of New South Wales – Alexander Stuart
Premier of South Australia – Sir John Cox Bray until 16 June then John Colton 
Premier of Tasmania – William Giblin until 15 August then Adye Douglas
Premier of Victoria – James Service

Events
 13 March – Daisy Bates married Breaker Morant.
 16 June – The South Australian government of John Bray lost a no confidence motion over the introduction of a new tax and Bray was replaced as premier by the opposition leader John Colton.
 October – Billy Hughes migrated to Australia.

Science and technology
Sydney and Melbourne connected by telephone.

Arts and literature

Sport
 November – Malua wins the Melbourne Cup

Births
8 February – Reginald "Snowy" Baker (died 1953), sportsman and actor
16 December – John Gunn (died 1959), Premier of South Australia
22 December – Bartlett Adamson (died 1951), journalist, poet, author and political activist

Deaths
25 January – James Francis (born 1819), Premier of Victoria
22 February – Sir Charles Sladen (born 1816), Premier of Victoria

Notes

 
Australia
Years of the 19th century in Australia